Suvodanje is a village in the municipality of Valjevo, Serbia. According to the 2002 census, the village has a population of 578 people.

References

Populated places in Kolubara District